Where the Trail Divides is a 1914 American  silent Western film directed by James Neill and written by William Otis Lillibridge. The film stars Robert Edeson, Theodore Roberts, J. W. Johnston, Winifred Kingston, James Neill and Constance Adams. The film was released on October 12, 1914, by Paramount Pictures.

Plot

Cast 
 Robert Edeson as 'How' Landor
 Theodore Roberts as Colonel William Landor
 J. W. Johnston as Clayton Craig 
 Winifred Kingston as Bess Landor
 James Neill as Sam Rowland
 Constance Adams as Mrs Rowland
 Fred Montague as Rev. John Eaton
 Antrim Short as Little 'How'
 Mary Higby as Little Bess

References

External links 
 

1914 films
1914 Western (genre) films
American black-and-white films
1910s English-language films
Paramount Pictures films
Silent American Western (genre) films
1910s American films